Karin de Boer (born 1965) is a Dutch Professor of Philosophy at the Katholieke Universiteit Leuven (KU Leuven). She is known for her works in modern philosophy and contemporary continental philosophy. Her main areas of research are Kant's theoretical philosophy and German Idealism, including works on Hegel, Heidegger and Derrida's thought.

Books 

 Thinking in the Light of Time: Heidegger's Encounter with Hegel (State University of New York Press, 2000)
 On Hegel: The Sway of the Negative (Palgrave Macmillan, 2010)
 Kant's Reform of Metaphysics: The Critique of Pure Reason Reconsidered (Cambridge University Press, 2020)

Edited 
 Conceptions of Critique in Modern and Contemporary Philosophy (Palgrave, 2011)
 The Experiential Turn in Eighteenth-Century German Philosophy (Routeledge, 2021)

Articles 
 Kant's Multi-Layered Conception of Things-in-Themselves, Transcendental Objects, and Monads (Kant-Studien 2014)
 Categories versus Schemata: Kant's Two-Aspect Theory of Pure Concepts and his Critique of Wolffian Metaphysics (JHP  2016)
 Kant's Response to Hume's Critique of Pure Reason (Archiv für Geschichte der Philosophie, 2019)

See also 

 Deconstruction
 Being and Time

References 

Dutch academics
Philosophy academics
1965 births
Living people